Roger de Weseham (also Wesenham) was an English medieval churchman and university chancellor.

Roger de Weseham was Doctor or Professor of Divinity. During 1294–7, he was Chancellor of the University of Oxford. He was also Archdeacon of Rochester and a Prebendary of Aylesbury.

References

Year of birth unknown
Year of death unknown
English Roman Catholic theologians
13th-century English Roman Catholic priests
Chancellors of the University of Oxford